Ripple Lane TMD, BR depot code RL, was a traction maintenance depot located to the south of Castle Green, London, England. The actual depot was situated between the running lines with the up line to the south of the depot and the down line to the north.

History 
In the 1970s and 1980s Ripple Lane was considered a sub-shed of Stratford (SF). At that time the depot had four roads each with an inspection pit. The building itself was of concrete and glass being long enough for a single Class 47 locomotive and without doors of any kind. In 1981 there were three Class 08 shunters outstationed at Ripple Lane shunting Ripple Lane yard and the nearby Ford factory. In addition to these shunters, in excess of 15 locomotives could be expected to stable overnight including shunters from Tilbury and Thameshaven. 

Before its closure in 1993, British Rail Class 08 shunters, Class 47, Class 20, Class 37 and Class 21 could be seen at the depot.

References

Sources

Railway depots in London